Pasipha is a genus of land planarians from South America.

Description 
Species of the genus Pasipha have a slender and flattened body with parallel margins while creeping. The copulatory apparatus lacks a permanent penis, having a long and highly folded male atrium instead. The prostatic vesicle is located outside the muscular coat of the copulatory apparatus and divided in two portions. The female canal enters the genital antrum ventrally.

Species 
There are 29 species assigned to the genus Pasipha:

Pasipha albicaudata Amaral & Leal-Zanchet, 2018
Pasipha astraea (Marcus, 1951)
Pasipha atla Negrete & Brusa, 2016
Pasipha backesi Leal-Zanchet, Rossi & Seitenfus, 2012
Pasipha brevilineata Leal-Zanchet, Rossi & Alvarenga, 2012
Pasipha caeruleonigra (Riester, 1938)
Pasipha cafusa (Froehlich, 1956)
Pasipha carajaensis Amaral & Leal-Zanchet, 2019
Pasipha chimbeva (E.M. Froehlich, 1955)
Pasipha ferrariaphila Leal-Zanchet & Marques, 2018
Pasipha hauseri (Froehlich, 1959)
Pasipha johnsoni Negrete & Brusa, 2016
Pasipha liviae 
Pasipha mbya Negrete & Brusa, 2016
Pasipha mesoxantha Amaral & Leal-Zanchet, 2016
Pasipha oliverioi (Froehlich, 1955)
Pasipha pasipha (Marcus, 1951)
Pasipha paucilineata Amaral & Leal-Zanchet, 2018
Pasipha penhana (Riester, 1938)
Pasipha pinima (E.M. Froehlich, 1955)
Pasipha plana (Schirch, 1929)
Pasipha quirogai Negrete & Brusa, 2017
Pasipha rosea (E.M. Froehlich, 1955)
Pasipha splendida (von Graff, 1899)
Pasipha tapetilla (Marcus, 1951)
Pasipha turvensis Amaral & Leal-Zanchet, 2016
Pasipha tutameia Amaral & Leal-Zanchet, 2019
Pasipha variistriata Amaral & Leal-Zanchet, 2018
Pasipha velutina (Riester, 1938)

Also, there are some species currently considered incertae sedis:

Pasipha aphalla (Hyman, 1941)
Pasipha diminutiva (Hyman, 1955)
Pasipha ercilla (E.M. Froehlich, 1978)
Pasipha chilensis (von Graff, 1899)
Pasipha velina (E.M. Froehlich, 1955)
Pasipha weyrauchi (Du Bois-Reymond Marcus, 1951)

References 

Geoplanidae
Rhabditophora genera